Galeopsis ladanum var. angustifolia, the red hemp-nettle, is a European annual plant growing to 30 cm tall. It flowers between June and October on waste ground, railway tracks, and other stony places. It is classified as critically endangered, having declined dramatically in the last 60 years due to increased fertiliser and herbicide. Modern farming techniques such as autumn cultivation have also affected the plant because they are killed before they have set seed.

References

ladanum var. angustifolia
Flora of the United Kingdom